Conus lozeti is a species of sea snail, a marine gastropod mollusk in the family Conidae, the cone snails and their allies.

Like all species within the genus Conus, these snails are predatory and venomous. They are capable of "stinging" humans, therefore live ones should be handled carefully or not at all.

Description
The size of the shell varies between 50 mm and 65 mm.

Distribution
This marine species occurs off Madagascar.

References

 Richard, G. 1980. Conus (Leptoconus) lozeti sp. nov. de l'Océan Indien et liste des types de Conidae conservés au Muséum national d'Histoire naturelle de Paris. Cahiers de l'Indo-Pacifique 2(1):90–100, 4 figs.
 Puillandre N., Duda T.F., Meyer C., Olivera B.M. & Bouchet P. (2015). One, four or 100 genera? A new classification of the cone snails. Journal of Molluscan Studies. 81: 1–23

External links
 The Conus Biodiversity website
 
 Holotype at MNHN, Paris

lozeti
Gastropods described in 1980